Getbol are mudflats, or tidal flats, coastal sedimentary systems. They are important habitats for different types of organisms, including migrating birds and marine fauna such as clams, crabs, octopuses, and snails. In 2021, four getbol sites in South Korea were listed as a UNESCO World Heritage Site due to their outstanding natural properties. Each of these sites represent a different type of getbol (estuarine type, open embayed type, archipelago type, and semi-enclosed type).

Description
The four getbol sites that are listed are the Seocheon Getbol, Gochang Getbol, Shinan Getbol and Boseong-Suncheon Getbol. Three sites are located on Korea's western coast while the Boseong-Suncheon Getbol is located on the southern coast. They were listed under criterion (x), which covers sites that "contain the most important and significant natural habitats for in-situ conservation of biological diversity, including those containing threatened species of outstanding universal value from the point of view of science or conservation." Some of the species present in getbols include the mud octopus, Japanese mud crabs, fiddler crab, bristle worms, Stimpson's ghost crab, and Yellow Sea sand snail. There are also several species of suspension feeders, such as clams. Getbols support endangered species of migratory birds on their route across the Yellow Sea, as stopover sites on the East Asian–Australasian Flyway. There were 22 IUCN Red List species recorded as visitors, including the critically endangered spoon-billed sandpiper. Furthermore, 375 species of benthic diatoms, 118 waterbirds, 857 macrobenthos, 152
marine macroalgae, 47 endemic and 5 endangered marine invertebrate species have been recorded in the protected areas.

The tidal flats developed after the Last glacial maximum, in an interplay of rivers depositing the sediments and their dispersal by tidal currents, wave action, and wind-induced currents. They formed especially in the estuaries of large rivers and in the island coasts. As a result of monsoon climate, erosion and chemical weathering in the coast is taking place in winter while the deposition of sediment is taking place in summer.

Threats
All four sites are strictly managed as Wetland Protected Area (WPA) under the Wetlands Conservation Act. Still, there are some risks that are posed to the environment by activities such as dredging of port and sea lanes, construction of land-to-island and island-to-island bridges, development of offshore wind-power generation, mining of marine aggregates, introduction of harmful or marine ecosystem disturbing species, and fishing activities of locals. The most detrimental activity is land reclamation, but such actions are strictly banned in the World Heritage Sites. Possible environmental pressures include marine and coastal pollution, climate change, coastal erosion, and oil spills.

References

Further reading
Getbol, the Korean tidal flats and sustainable seafood dining by The Korea Herald
Korean tidal flats to join UNESCO Natural World Heritage list by The Korea Times

External links
Official Website (in Korean)

World Heritage Sites in South Korea
Nature conservation in South Korea
Wetlands of South Korea
South Chungcheong Province